Gopaldas Saxena (known by his nom-de-plume, Neeraj; 4 January 1925 – 19 July 2018) was an Indian poet and author of Hindi literature. He was also a poet of Hindi Kavi sammelan (Poets Meet). He wrote under the pen name "Neeraj".

Biography
Gopaldas Saxena was born in the village of Puravali, near Mahewa in Etawah district of Uttar Pradesh, India, on 4 January 1925. He was born into a Hindu family of the Kayastha caste. 
Besides writing, he earned his living teaching in a college and was a Professor of Hindi Literature in Dharma Samaj College, Aligarh. Around 2012, Neeraj was the chancellor of Mangalayatan University, Aligarh, Uttar Pradesh.

Several poems and songs written by Neeraj have been used in Hindi movies. He wrote songs for several Hindi films and was proficient in both Hindi and Urdu. In a television interview, Neeraj called himself an unlucky poet who had to concentrate on the poetry form instead of writing songs for films. His career as a film lyricist ended when he became depressed by the deaths of some of the film music directors with whom he had worked. He noted in particular the deaths of Jaikishan of the music duo Shankar–Jaikishan, and S. D. Burman, for both of whom he had written highly popular film songs.

He was awarded the Padma Shri in 1991 and Padma Bhushan in 2007.

Neeraj died, aged 93, on 19 July 2018 in New Delhi. He had been admitted to hospital with a lung infection.

Filmography 
Some of the popular film songs written by Neeraj include:

References

External links 

 
 Get All Poems of Gopaldas Neeraj at Hindi Sahitya
  गोपाल दस नीरज- कविताकोश Gopaldas Neeraj at Kavita Kosh
 C.M. announces Rs. 20 lakh assistance for Gopaldas Neeraj Foundation
 International Hindi association features Gopaldas Neeraj
 Life and work of Neeraj
 भारतीय साहित्य संग्रह में नीरज की कृतियाँ 
 An account from the Atlanta appearance by the poet Neeraj which took place in October 2004

1925 births
2018 deaths
Hindi-language poets
Hindi-language writers
Indian male songwriters
Hindi-language lyricists
20th-century Indian writers
People from Etawah
Recipients of the Padma Bhushan in literature & education
People from Aligarh
Recipients of the Padma Shri in literature & education
20th-century Indian male writers
Indian lyricists